The British Rowing Championships usually take place every year. The event is held at the National Water Sports Centre, Holme Pierrepont (Nottingham) with occasional championships held at the Strathclyde Country Park. The championships originally incorporated Senior and Junior crews but since 2013 have been held separately. It is a major event for club rowers and schools and events are held for open, women, open junior, women's junior, under 23, lightweight, adaptive and coastal boats.

Each crew member of the first, second and third placed crews in each event receive gold, silver and bronze medals respectively. The club champion in each event (i.e. the highest placed non-composite crew) also receives a wooden club champions plaque to display in their clubhouse.

History
The Championships were inaugurated in 1972 and held at the National Watersports Centre in Nottingham, which had only been built the previous year.

In 2010, the Regatta adopted the title British Rowing Championships to reflect the change in name of the Amateur Rowing Association to British Rowing. The logo and branding now reflects that of British Rowing. The 40th anniversary of the Championships was celebrated in 2012. Although it has been the practice for the Championships to be held in Scotland at the Strathclyde Country Park every fourth year, the 2014 Championships was held in Nottingham. This was because Scotland hosted the 2014 Commonwealth Rowing Championships at Strathclyde Country Park. Since 2016, the Championships have only been held in Nottingham.

A decision was taken in 2012 that in order to raise the standard of senior competition, the senior events from the Championships would be moved to autumn from 2013. This resulted in the Championships splitting into the senior championships and junior championships, with the latter continuing to be held during July. 

In 2019, the Senior Championships were cancelled due to insufficient entries and the 2020 edition was not scheduled, with British Rowing stating it was reviewing the dates and format following the lack of entries for the 2019 Championships. The event was not been scheduled for 2021 or 2022, with no official statement available as to future plans.

Dates and locations of Championships

Senior and Junior combined

Senior Championships

Junior Championships

References 

Rowing competitions in the United Kingdom
National championships in the United Kingdom
British Rowing Championships